Punta Pioppeto Lighthouse is an active lighthouse located on the northernmost promontory of Procida, Campania on the Tyrrhenian Sea.

Description
The lighthouse was built in 1849 and consisted of 1-storey octagonal base keeper's house, now in a state of completely disuse and devastation, since the last keeper left and the lighthouse was automated. The lighthouse is completely automated and operated by the Marina Militare with the identification code number 2358 E.F.

See also
 List of lighthouses in Italy
 Procida

References

External links

 Servizio Fari Marina Militare

Lighthouses in Italy